Heliopetes laviana, the Laviana white-skipper or Laviana skipper, is a butterfly in the family Hesperiidae. It is found from Argentina through Central America and northern Mexico to southern Texas. Strays can be found in southern Arizona and central and northern Texas. The habitat consists of edges of brushy areas, trails, roadsides, open woodland, thorn forest and streamsides.

The wingspan is 35–42 mm. The upperside of the males is white with dark markings along the outer wing margins. Females have wider markings than males and also have grey wing bases. The underside of the hindwings has an olive-grey patch on the outer third which is sharply separated from the paler median area. The dark basal area contains a pale triangular patch. There are multiple generations per year in southern Texas. Adults feed on flower nectar.

The larvae feed on the leaves of various mallows, including Sphaeralcea, Sida and Abutilon species. They live in a nest of folded leaves.

Subspecies
Heliopetes laviana laviana (Texas, Arizona, Mexico, Nicaragua, Colombia)
Heliopetes laviana leca (Butler, 1870) (Venezuela)

References

Butterflies described in 1868
Pyrgini
Butterflies of North America
Butterflies of Central America
Hesperiidae of South America
Taxa named by William Chapman Hewitson